Milan Fillo (23 April 1929 Žilina – 2 November 2004 Karlovy Vary) was a Czechoslovak sprinter. He competed in the men's 400 metres at the 1952 Summer Olympics.

References

Olympic athletes of Czechoslovakia
Athletes (track and field) at the 1952 Summer Olympics
Czechoslovak male sprinters
Slovak male sprinters
Sportspeople from Žilina
1929 births
2004 deaths